Dranga is a surname. Notable people with the surname include:

 Helen Thomas Dranga (1866–1940), English-born American Painter
 Pyotr Dranga (born 1984), Russian accordionist
 Ted Dranga, crew member on the second Tanager Expedition

See also
 Dranga, an administrative region in the Kingdom of Licchavi